Science Agrees is the debut studio album by American-English band D.A.R.K. It was released on September 9, 2016 through Cooking Vinyl.

The band features English musician and former The Smiths bassist Andy Rourke, New York City-based DJ, Olé Koretsky, and Irish singer-songwriter and The Cranberries vocalist Dolores O'Riordan.

Critical reception
Science Agrees was met with mixed or average reviews from critics. At Metacritic, which assigns a weighted average rating out of 100 to reviews from mainstream publications, this release received an average score of 55, based on 5 reviews.

Track listing

References

2016 debut albums
Cooking Vinyl albums